"Believe in Me" is the title of a popular song written and recorded by the American singer-songwriter Dan Fogelberg. The song appears on Fogelberg's eighth studio album Windows and Walls (1984).

Song Background
When "Believe in Me" was recorded in May 1983, Fogelberg handled most of the musical creation himself, playing guitar and bass as well as recording his vocals; musician Mike Hanna (who played acoustic guitar on the track) was the only other performer in the studio. Fogelberg later described the song in the liner notes to a retrospective album: "One of my best love songs. Written at my old house in Nederland, Colorado, while building the ranch. Obviously, all was not well."

Chart performance
Released as the second single from Windows and Walls, "Believe in Me" missed the Top 40 of the Billboard Hot 100 chart, where it peaked at No. 48. However, on the Billboard adult contemporary chart, where Fogelberg had enjoyed more consistent success, the song became his fourth No. 1 hit, following his earlier singles "Longer", "Leader of the Band", and "Make Love Stay".

Charts

Weekly charts

Year-end charts

See also
List of number-one adult contemporary singles of 1984 (U.S.)

References

1984 singles
Dan Fogelberg songs
Songs written by Dan Fogelberg
1984 songs
Full Moon Records singles